The Eagle & Child is a pub on High Petergate, in the city centre of York, in England.

The building was constructed in the early 17th-century, as a three-storey timber-framed building, with attics and a jettied front.  In the 18th-century, the building was altered internally, and a brick extension was added at the rear, shared with the neighbouring Petergate House.  The building's staircase survives from this period.  Late that century, bays were added at the front, which survive at the first- and second-floor levels.  There is a large chimney between the front and rear rooms of the original part of the building, with fireplaces surviving from the 17th-, 18th- and early-19th centuries.  The building was further altered in the 20th-century, and the ground floor shopfront dates from this era.

By the mid-1960s, the building was a restaurant, when the Rolling Stones signed their names in lipstick on the wall of the top floor, graffiti which has been preserved.  In 1977, the restaurant became Plunketts, which operated until 2015.  That year, the Leeds Brewery converted it into the Eagle & Child pub, the name taken from a pub which operated on The Shambles from the 1700s until 1925.  In 2017, it was taken over by Camerons Brewery, who refurbished the pub.

The building has been grade II* listed since 1954.

References

External links

Grade II* listed pubs in York
Petergate
Timber framed buildings in Yorkshire
Timber framed pubs in England